Damian Durkacz (born 30 January 1999) is a Polish boxer. He competed in the men's lightweight event at the 2020 Summer Olympics.

References

External links
 

1999 births
Living people
Polish male boxers
Olympic boxers of Poland
Boxers at the 2020 Summer Olympics
Place of birth missing (living people)
European Games competitors for Poland
Boxers at the 2019 European Games
20th-century Polish people
21st-century Polish people